Jennifer Goodwin (born ) is a New Zealand journalist, television newsreader and continuity announcer. On Monday 30 June 1975 she became a news presenter on the newly launched TV-2, making her New Zealand's first female television newsreader, and the first woman within the Commonwealth of Nations to present a prime time news programme. Prior to her work at TV-2, Goodwin worked in radio before moving into television in the 1960s, where she initially worked as a continuity announcer. In 2009 she was one of several former TVNZ presenters to return to the station to celebrate 40 years of television network news in New Zealand.

See also
 List of New Zealand television personalities

References

External links

Year of birth missing (living people)
1940s births
New Zealand television newsreaders and news presenters
Living people